Anand Amritraj (Tamil: ஆனந்த் அம்ரித்ராஜ்; born 20 March 1951) is a former Indian tennis player and businessman. He along with brother Vijay Amritraj led India into the 1974 Davis Cup finals against South Africa  and was a part of the Indian team captained by Vijay Amritraj which reached the final of the Davis Cup in 1987 against Sweden.

Career
Anand Amritraj and his younger brothers, Vijay and Ashok, were among the first Indians to play in top-flight international tour tennis. In 1976, Anand and Vijay were semifinalists in the Wimbledon men's doubles. Anand was part of the Indian team for 1974 Davis Cup, which advanced to the finals of the tournament and then forfeited the championship to South Africa as the Government of India decided to boycott the match in protest South Africa's Apartheid policies, and again reached the final in 1987 against Sweden.

His son Stephen Amritraj is also an American former professional tennis player who represented India. He did schooling from Don Bosco and graduated from Loyola College in Madras.
 His daughter-in-law Alison Riske is also a top-50 player on the WTA Tour.

Career finals

Doubles: 30 (12–18)

References

External links
 
 
 
 

1951 births
Indian male tennis players
Indian Roman Catholics
Living people
Racket sportspeople from Chennai
Recipients of the Arjuna Award
Tamil sportspeople
Amritraj family